Bhor Assembly constituency is one of the 288 Vidhan Sabha (legislative assembly) constituencies of Maharashtra state, western India. This constituency is located in Pune district. election result

Geographical scope
The constituency comprises Mulshi taluka, Velhe taluka, Bhor taluka and ward nos. 157, 159 and 160 of Pune Municipal Corporation.

Members of Legislative Assembly

 1952 : Mohol Namdev Sadashiv alias Mamasaheb Mohol  (defeated Nanasaheb Khopade)

References

Assembly constituencies of Pune district
Assembly constituencies of Maharashtra